Government Girls PG College, Ujjain, also known by the shorter names as Girls PG College, Ujjain or Girls PG College, is a government Girls college located in Ujjain, Madhya Pradesh, India. It is recognized by the University Grants Commission (UGC) and affiliated to Vikram University. it is accredited A grade by the National Assessment and Accreditation Council(NAAC)

References

External links
 

Commerce colleges in India
Science colleges in India
Universities and colleges in Madhya Pradesh
Education in Ujjain
Educational institutions established in 1950
1950 establishments in India